Tom-Jaye Waibeiya (born ) is a Nauruan male weightlifter, competing in the 77 kg category and representing Nauru at international competitions. He participated at the 2014 Commonwealth Games in the 77 kg event.

Major competitions

References

1995 births
Living people
Nauruan male weightlifters
Place of birth missing (living people)
Weightlifters at the 2014 Commonwealth Games
Commonwealth Games competitors for Nauru